Huang Junjie  (born 9 July 1998), is a Chinese actor. He was admitted to Sichuan Mianyang Art School, majoring in theatre and film performing arts at 2014.He made his first acting debut at 24 Seconds in 2016.

Filmography

Film

Television series

Variety show

Discography

Awards and nominations

References

1998 births
Living people
Male actors from Chongqing
Chinese male television actors
Chinese male film actors
21st-century Chinese male actors
Beijing Film Academy alumni